Christine Busta (23 April 1915, Vienna, Austria – 3 December 1987, Vienna) was an Austrian poet.

In her work, she stood for an undogmatic Catholicism.

Awards and honours
 1950 Promotion Prize for Literature
 1954 Georg Trakl Prize
 1961 Promotion Prize for Literature
 1963 Droste Prize
 1964 Literary Prize of the City of Vienna
 1969 Grand Austrian State Prize for Literature
 1975 Anton Wildgans Prize
 1980 Honorary Medal of the capital Vienna in gold
 1980 Austrian Medal for Science and Art
 1981 Theodor Körner Prize

References 

1915 births
1987 deaths
20th-century Austrian poets
20th-century women writers
Austrian lyricists
Austrian women writers
Austrian women poets
Anton Wildgans Prize winners
Recipients of the Grand Austrian State Prize
Recipients of the Austrian Decoration for Science and Art
Austrian Roman Catholics
Austrian people of Slavic descent
People from Rudolfsheim-Fünfhaus
Writers from Vienna
Burials at Ottakring Cemetery